Edward or Eddie Hart may refer to:
Eddie Hart (athlete) (born 1949), American athlete
Eddie Hart (Australian footballer) (1922–1995), Australian rules footballer
Edward Hart (physician) (1911–1986), Scottish physician
Edward Hart (settler), signer of the Flushing Remonstrance
Edward Hart (soccer) (1903–?), American soccer player
Edward J. Hart (1893–1961), American politician
Edward L. Hart (1916–2008), poet
Ed Hart (1887–1956), American football player
Edward Hart (goldsmith), 16th century Scottish goldsmith

See also
Edward H. Harte (1922–2011), American newspaper executive, journalist, philanthropist, and conservationist